Obolodiplosis is a genus of gall midges (insects in the family Cecidomyiidae). It is monotypic, being represented by the single species Obolodiplosis robiniae, commonly known as the locust gall midge.

References

Further reading

 
 
 
 
 

Cecidomyiinae
Articles created by Qbugbot
Sciaroidea genera